In computability theory, the mortality problem is a decision problem which can be stated as follows:

Given a Turing machine, decide whether it halts when run on any configuration (not necessarily a starting one)

In the statement above, the configuration is a pair , where q is one of the machine's states (not necessarily its initial state) and w is an infinite sequence of symbols representing the initial content of the tape. Note that while we usually assume that in the starting configuration all but finitely many cells on the tape are blanks, in the mortality problem the tape can have arbitrary content, including infinitely many non-blank symbols written on it.

Philip K. Hooper proved in 1966 that the mortality problem is undecidable. However, it can be shown that the set of Turing machines which are mortal (i.e. halt on every starting configuration) is recursively enumerable.

Theory of computation
Undecidable problems